Ralph Abernethy Gamble (May 6, 1885 – March 4, 1959) was a Republican politician who represented Westchester County, New York in the United States House of Representatives from 1937 to 1957. He was a member of the prominent Gamble family of South Dakota.

Life
Gamble was born on May 6, 1885, in Yankton, South Dakota. He graduated from Princeton University in 1909, from George Washington University Law School in 1911, and from Columbia Law School in 1912.  He practiced first in New York City, and later in Larchmont.  He was counsel for the town of Mamaroneck from 1918 to 1933, and for the town of Larchmont from 1926-1928.

He was a member of the New York State Assembly (Westchester Co., 2nd D.) in 1931, 1932, 1933, 1934, 1935, 1936 and 1937.

He was elected to Congress in 1937 to fill the vacancy caused by the resignation of Charles D. Millard and served from November 2, 1937, to January 3, 1957. He was chairman of the United States Congress Joint Committee on Housing during the 80th United States Congress.

He died on March 4, 1959, in Saint Michaels, Maryland.

Sources

External links

1885 births
1959 deaths
People from Yankton, South Dakota
Princeton University alumni
George Washington University Law School alumni
Columbia Law School alumni
Republican Party members of the New York State Assembly
Republican Party members of the United States House of Representatives from New York (state)
20th-century American politicians